Viral Tap was a British television comedy panel game shown on ITV2 which ran from 27 April to 15 June 2014. The show was presented by the late Caroline Flack and stars regular panellists Matt Richardson, Carly Smallman and Jim Chapman as a side show presenter.

The show features viewers sending in viral videos which could earn them either £250, £500 or £1,000.

Episodes

References

External links

2010s British game shows
2010s British comedy television series
2014 British television series debuts
2014 British television series endings
English-language television shows
Television series by Warner Bros. Television Studios
ITV comedy
ITV panel games